Gösta Sandahl (born January 13, 1893) was a Swedish figure skater. He was the 1912 European Champion and the 1914 World Champion. He stopped participating in the sport in 1916 due to religious reasons, but made a temporary comeback in 1923, and won the Swedish Championships that year.

Results

References

External links
 Skatabase: 1910s Worlds
 Skatabase: 1910s Europeans

Swedish male single skaters
World Figure Skating Championships medalists
European Figure Skating Championships medalists